Miloš Ković (born 13 May 1969) is a Serbian historian and university professor at Faculty of Philosophy, University of Belgrade.

Areas of his research are International Relations (late 18th to early 20th century) and History of Political Ideas (late 18th to early 20th century).

Aside from his work at University of Belgrade, Ković taught at University of Banja Luka and a number of societies and organisation in Serbia and the region.

Ković spent one year of his postgraduate studies at University of Oxford. In 2015 Ković won the Ilarion Ruvarac award of the Matica Srpska.

During the trial of Ratko Mladić, Ković appeared as witness of defence at the ICTY. According to Ković, ICTY's main task is not to condemn criminals, but to "rewrite Serbian history" and "to imprint a mark of collective guilt on Serbs."

In March 2022, Ković was returned from the border by the Bosnian authorities on his way to a lecture in East Sarajevo, based on the assessment that he was a "threat to the security of BiH."

In April 2022, Ković signed a petition calling for Serbia not to impose sanctions on Russia after it invaded Ukraine.

Ković advocates strengthening of the Russian and Chinese influence in the Balkans and promotes anti-Western and anti-NATO rhetoric.

Works
Books
 Ković, Miloš. Disraeli and the Eastern Question. Oxford: Oxford University Press, 2011. XX, 339 pp., Ill.  [COBISS.SR-ID 520123543]
 Ković, Miloš. Dizraeli i istočno pitanje. Belgrade: Clio, 2007. 509 pages, illustrations.  [COBISS.SR-ID 144919052]
 

Selected articles
 Ković, Miloš. Jovan Skerlić's political ideas: a view from 2014. Letopis Matice srpske, okt. 2014, vol. 494, vol. 4, pp. 465–472. [COBISS.SR-ID 290550279]
 Ković, Miloš. Imagining the Serbs: revisionism in the recent historiography of nineteenth-sentury Serbian history. Balcanica, 2012, vol. 43, pp. 325–346. [COBISS.SR-ID 522464663]
 Ković, Miloš. The Beginning of the 1875 Serbian Uprising in Herzegovina: the British Perspective. Balcanica, 2010, vol. \ 41, pp. 55–71. [COBISS.SR-ID 520562583]
 Ković, Miloš. Robert Lloyd-Lynch's mission in Serbia in 1876. Historical Journal, 2011, vol. 60, pp. 377–391. [COBISS.SR-ID 521065367]
 Ković, Miloš. The British and Haxhi-Loja's Revolution: Consul Edward Freeman on the 1878 Uprising and Occupation of Sarajevo. Mixed materials, 2011, vol. 32, pp. 381–414. [COBISS.SR-ID 521064855]
 Ković, Miloš. A contribution to the history of the Serbian left: romanticism and patriotism of Jovan Skerlić. Law & Society, 2011. 3, no. 3/4, pp. 85–98. [COBISS.SR-ID 189029132]
 Ković, Miloš. Knowledge or intention: contemporary world historiography on Serbs in the 19th century. Sociology, 2011, 53, 4, pp. 401–416. [COBISS.SR-ID 521619351]
 Ković, Miloš. Great Britain and Bosnia and Herzegovina in the Eastern Crisis: (1875-1878). Zbornik za istoriju Bosne i Hercegovine, 2009, 6, pp. 159–173. [COBISS.SR-ID 521595543]
 Ković, Miloš. The press as a source of knowledge and as a political tool: party papers of the Kingdom of Serbia on Raška (1903-1907). Mileševski zapisi, 1996, no. 2, pp. 257–274. [COBISS.SR-ID 51711170]

References

1969 births
People from Šabac
21st-century Serbian historians
University of Belgrade alumni
Living people